Lobelia archeri is a small herbaceous plant in the family Campanulaceae native to Western Australia, first described in 2010 by Neville Walsh.

The herb is found in a small area near Esperance in the Goldfields-Esperance region of Western Australia.

References

archeri
Flora of Western Australia
Plants described in 2010
Taxa named by Neville Grant Walsh